Chūichi, Chuichi or Chuuichi (written: 忠一) is a masculine Japanese given name. Notable people with the name include:

, Japanese politician
, Japanese politician
, Japanese admiral
, Japanese admiral

Japanese masculine given names